This is a list of the seasons completed by the Duke Blue Devils men's basketball.

Season by season results

References

 
Duke Blue Devils
Duke Blue Devils basketball seasons